SAP Garden is a planned 12,500-seat indoor arena, to be built in Olympiapark, Munich. It will not be completed until spring 2024 at the earliest. The site will be built at the location of the former Radstadion which was demolished in 2015. It will become the home rink to ice hockey team EHC Red Bull Munich and home court to basketball team Bayern Munich.

History

Plans for a new indoor arena arose primarily from the wish for a new home arena for the ice hockey team EHC Red Bull Munich who currently play at the Olympia Eishalle which was opened five years prior to the 1972 Olympic Games. In addition, BBL team Bayern Munich, playing at the Olympic basketball arena, sought a modern arena. In December 2014, the city council of Munich announced bidding for the new arena, to be built at the location of the Radstadion.
Architect is 3XN.

In 2019, it was reported that SAP gained naming rights for the arena. To avoid confusion with the SAP Arena in Mannheim, three naming proposals have been made to be voted under hashtag #NameGameOn: SAP Live (which received 9.9% of the votes), SAP Park (44.8%) and SAP Garden (45.3%). 

Groundbreaking was originally announced to take place in the winter of 2019. The first excavation work on the site began on 13 January 2020. Furthermore, the construction of the provisional construction roads with sidewalks and a pedestrian crossing started, which made accompanying tree felling work necessary. A partial building permit was available for this. The foundation stone was laid on 23 February 2021, but without guests and visitors due to the COVID-19 pandemic.

See also
List of indoor arenas in Germany

References

External links
 
  

Indoor arenas in Germany
Indoor ice hockey venues in Germany
Basketball venues in Germany
Proposed indoor arenas
Indoor arenas under construction
Sports venues in Munich